Fabrice Moreau (born 11 January 1978) is a French rower. He competed in the Men's lightweight coxless four event at the 2012 Summer Olympics.

References

External links
 

1978 births
Living people
French male rowers
Olympic rowers of France
Rowers at the 2012 Summer Olympics
Sportspeople from Le Creusot
World Rowing Championships medalists for France
Mediterranean Games gold medalists for France
Mediterranean Games medalists in rowing
Competitors at the 2005 Mediterranean Games